The Annunciation Church is a Cultural Monument of Albania, located in Mjekës, Shirgjan municipal unit of the Elbasan County.

References

Cultural Monuments of Albania
Church ruins in Albania
Buildings and structures in Elbasan